Selin Kuralay (born 25 January 1985 in Melbourne, Australia) is an Australian soccer player of Turkish ancestry.
She plays at national league level for Australian W-League team Melbourne Victory.

Club career

Junior football
Kuralay took up football as a six-year-old, playing for North Coburg. She later played with Ringwood City and Box Hill United. In 2001, she was jointly awarded (with Spase Dilevski) the Weinstein Medal as Victorian Junior Player of the Year. She is the only female footballer to have won the medal.

WNSL
Kuralay made her debut at national league level in 1999 when she played for Victoria Vision in the Australian Women's National Soccer League. She won the Rising Star award for the league in the 2000–01 season.

In 2004 Kuralay played for the Queensland Academy of Sport in the WNSL, scoring two goals.

W-League (USA)
In 2005 Kuralay played 12 matches for the Hampton Roads Piranhas in the American W-League.

College soccer

Florida State University
Kuralay began her college soccer career for Florida State University in the Atlantic Coast Conference. In 2005, her first season for FSU, she scored 16 goals and made nine assists both of which were records for a first year player. Kuralay was a first team National Soccer Coaches Association of America All-America team member. She was a semifinalist in the 2005 Hermann Trophy. She was one of 11 Soccer America Magazine MVPs for 2005.

In 2006, her second season, she tied the FSU record for game-winning goals. She was also selected in Soccer Buzz Magazine's All-America team

Savannah College of Art and Design
Kuralay played in 2008 for Savannah College of Art and Design in The Sun Conference. In her only season at SCAD she scored 10 goals and laid off five assists in 15 matches. She was named in the 2008 National Association of Intercollegiate Athletics All-America team.

W-League (Australia)
In 2008 Kuralay joined the Melbourne Victory. She scored two goals on her debut to help Victory defeat Adelaide United.

International career

Under 19
In 2002 Kuralay played for the Australian team at the FIFA U-19 Women's World Championship in Canada. In May 2002 she scored five goals in Australia's 13–0 win in a World Cup Qualifying match against Samoa.

She was selected for her second U-19 World Championship in 2004, which was held in Thailand.

Senior women's team
After making her debut against New Zealand in February 2004, Kuralay played 22 times for the Australia women's national football (soccer) team and scored two goals.

Kuralay played three matches for the Australian women's football team at the Athens Olympics and also represented Australia at the 2002 and 2004 FIFA Under-19 Women's World Championship finals.

Honours

Individual
Weinstein Medal – Joint Winner – 2001
Women's National Soccer League Rising Star – Winner – 2001
National Soccer Coaches Association of America All-America team member
Hermann Trophy Semifinalist – 2005.
Soccer America Magazine MVP – 2005
Soccer Buzz Magazine – All-America team – 2006
National Association of Intercollegiate Athletics All-America team – 2008

References

1985 births
Living people
Australian women's soccer players
Australian people of Turkish descent
Soccer players from Melbourne
Florida State University alumni
Melbourne Victory FC (A-League Women) players
Adelaide United FC (A-League Women) players
A-League Women players
Olympic soccer players of Australia
Footballers at the 2004 Summer Olympics
Victorian Institute of Sport alumni
Australia women's international soccer players
Women's association football midfielders
Florida State Seminoles women's soccer players
Ringwood City SC players
Australian expatriate sportspeople in the United States
Expatriate women's soccer players in the United States
Australian expatriate women's soccer players
Sportswomen from Victoria (Australia)